Elias Melka Geresu (() 10 December 1977 – 4 October 2019) was an Ethiopian record producer and songwriter. Elias became popular after successfully composing Teddy Afro's debut album Abugida, which was released in 2001. Elias has composed more than forty studio albums and has worked with many and the most influential singers in modern Ethiopian music history. Until his death on 4 October 2019, he had played a crucial role in the Ethiopian music industry.

Biography

Early life 
Elias Melka was born in Sebategna, Addis Ababa, Ethiopia from his father Melka Geresu and his mother Atsede Feleke and raised in Abinet, Addis Ababa. Elias was born to Protestant families, and this led him to become a member of  church choir. This put instilled in Elias a great passion of music, and he left the church after grasping typical knowledge on composing music. After this, Elias proceeded on his journey and went to join Yared Music School, which is in Addis Ababa, Ethiopia, majoring in cello, piano and the traditional instrument kirar.

Career 
Elias was believed to be the first person to introduce the practice of studio music production in Ethiopia. Some of the artists whose albums were composed by Elias are Teddy Afro, Gossaye Tesfaye, Mikaya Behailu, Eyob Mekonnen, Zeritu Kebede, Tigist Bekele, Haile Roots, Gete Anley, Berry, and Leul Hailu. Elias was also a leader in taking social responsibility, having produced more than half a dozen singles that deal with HIV/AIDS and traffic accidents and others. These songs made by himself and collaborated with others greatly helped the effort to educate people about these societal dangers. From those, "Ashkerkir Rega Bileh" and "Mela Belu" are the priors.

His last works were tended to allegedly Biblical incitation artistic works. These are the song entitled "yenem ayn aytual" by Zeritu Kebede and a choir titled "nur batamnm". There are also many other songs which played by famous Ethiopian artists, namely: Eyob Mekonnen, Zeritu Kebede, Haile Root, Leul Hailu, Gete Anley, and Berry. Elias was successful and known to nurture new musicians and improve the singing style of notable ones.

Bands 
Zion religious music band was Elias' first band, he left religious band Zion and joined Medina Band and played guitar in this band and then joined Zema Lastas, Afro Sound bound and Demera Band.

Award 
Elias has won four great awards in Ethiopia, the first of which is WIPO's International Award which was given to Ethiopian musicians, the second one which was an award given to him for composing different Kunama songs, the third one was given by the Fana Broadcasting Corporate, local broadcasting media, as a Life Time Award, and the last one was by Addis Music Award, for extra effort he put for Ethiopian music at all.

Understanding the unprofitable nature of the music industry in the country of Ethiopia, Elias has exerted extra efforts to ensure the national system that enables the artist to get its share from their songs and it is known as Awtar Music Application.

Death 
Melka, having struggled with diabetes and kidney complications, died on 4 October 2019. Following this, people showed their condolences through different social media; among them singer Teddy Afro on his Facebook said "I would like to express my deepest condolences on the death of our beloved composer, Elias Melka. Elias will always be remembered above the grave for his career in music and his works of art. I sincerely hope that the Almighty God may place his soul in heaven and give comfort to all his fans, friends, relatives and colleagues." The Ministry of Mines and Petroleum Takele Uma Banti expressed his condolences on twitter said "Saddened to learn the passing of renowned lyricist and composer, Elias Melka. We lost a talented and influential figure in the music industry. My condolences to his family and fans."

Notes

References 

1977 births
2019 deaths
Deaths from diabetes
Deaths from kidney failure
Ethiopian composers
Ethiopian songwriters
People from Addis Ababa